Seinäjoki sub-region  is a subdivision of Southern Ostrobothnia and one of the Sub-regions of Finland since 2009.

Municipalities
 Ilmajoki
 Isokyrö
 Kauhava
 Kurikka
 Lapua
 Seinäjoki

Politics
Results of the 2018 Finnish presidential election:

 Sauli Niinistö   63.2%
 Laura Huhtasaari   9.7%
 Paavo Väyrynen   9.1%
 Matti Vanhanen   8.9%
 Pekka Haavisto   5.1%
 Tuula Haatainen   2.4%
 Merja Kyllönen   1.4%
 Nils Torvalds   0.3%

Sub-regions of Finland
Geography of South Ostrobothnia